Celaenorrhinus nigricans, also known as the small banded flat, is a species of hesperiid butterfly found in South and Southeast Asia.

Range
The butterfly occurs in India, Bhutan, Myanmar, Thailand, Laos, the Malay Peninsula, Borneo and southern Yunnan, China. In India, the butterfly ranges from Sikkim eastwards to southern Myanmar.

Status
In 1932, William Harry Evans described the species as being not rare.

Cited references

See also
Hesperiidae
List of butterflies of India (Hesperiidae)

References

Print

Online
 

nigricans
Butterflies of Asia
Butterflies of Indochina